Osman Rashid is a Pakistani American businessman in Silicon Valley, California. He has worked in enterprise software and consumer products.

He was co-founder and CEO of three companies, an online textbook rental and student hub Chegg, remaining involved in it until early 2010 after growing the company from its inception in 2005.
He was co-founder and CEO of Kno, Inc., (acquired by Intel in November 2013) a digital education platform company. Kno, Inc. has received funding from Andreessen Horowitz, Intel Capital, Goldman Sachs, FLOODGATE and GSV Capital, while Chegg was funded by KPCB, IVP, Gabriel Ventures and others. He founded Galxyz Inc., in 2014, which was an educational software company focusing on creating next generation language arts and science enhancement products for Primary and Middle School students.

Currently, Rashid is managing two companies. He is the CEO of Convo Corp, an enterprise software company that focuses on in-context collaboration that is used as a conversational tool at work. His most recent venture is SOAR Education, of which he is the co-founder and chairman. His aim is to spread this network throughout the country in pursuit of his passion to providing access to transformational education to the children of developing countries.

Personal life
Osman Rashid was born in London, did his early schooling in Ghana and finished Middle and High School from Islamabad, Pakistan. He later moved to the United States where he received his Bachelor's degree in Electrical Engineering from University of Minnesota in 1993.

Professional career
Before founding Galxyz, Chegg and Kno, Rashid also started Gravitywell, an ASP based customer service solution, and worked at Venturian, a subsidiary of ATIO Corporation, where Osman served as VP of Business Development and Marketing. Between start-ups, Osman was Director of Business Development at Chordiant Software, Inc.

Awards
He was awarded Ernst & Young Entrepreneur of The Year Award in 2009 for Consumer Products in Northern CA.

He has also been recognized as Forbes Impact 15 for 2012 and as Inc.’s Immigrant Edge: 9 Wildly Successful Entrepreneurs.

Philanthropy
Osman helped spearhead Chegg for Good program which plants a tree for every rental made, and to date has helped plant over 6 million trees. At Kno he developed a partnership with DonorsChoose.org to donate $1 of every sale made to help classrooms get school supplies. Osman is actively involved as a board member at ChildLife Foundation Pakistan which is bringing critical care and prevention of diseases to millions of young and needy children in Pakistan through a network of Urgent Care Clinics.

He plans to set up an Endowment Fund to provide quality education to the financially disadvantaged, of which the platform is SOAR STEM Schools.

References

External links
 Leadership page at Kno official website

American computer businesspeople
Businesspeople in software
University of Minnesota College of Science and Engineering alumni
Living people
American expatriates in Pakistan
1970 births